This is a list of British television related events from 1953.

Events

January
No events.

February
No events.

March
17 March – Patrick Troughton becomes television's first Robin Hood, playing the eponymous folk hero in the first of six half-hour episodes of Robin Hood, shown weekly until 21 April on the BBC Television Service.

April
No events.

May
1 May – The BBC brings into service television transmitters at Pontop Pike (County Durham) and Glencairn (Belfast) to improve coverage prior to the Coronation broadcast.

June
2 June – The Coronation of Queen Elizabeth II is televised in the UK on the BBC Television Service. Sales of TV sets rise sharply in the weeks leading up to the event. It is also one of the earliest broadcasts to be deliberately recorded for posterity and still exists in its entirety today.

July
18 July – The Quatermass Experiment, first of the famous Quatermass science-fiction serials by Nigel Kneale, begins its run on the BBC.
20 July – The Good Old Days begins on the BBC Television Service.

August
No events.

September
No events.

October
No events.

November
11 November – The current affairs series Panorama launches on the BBC Television Service. It is now the longest-running programme in British television history.
26 November – Peers in the House of Lords back Government plans for the introduction of commercial television in the UK.

December
2 December – The BBC broadcasts its 'Television Symbol' for the first time, the first animated television presentation symbol in the world. Known as the 'bat's wings' by logo enthusiasts, it would remain until 1960.
31 December – The BBC begins a long series of New Year's Eve broadcasts from Scotland with Hogmanay Party.
Peter Scott presents the first BBC television natural history broadcast, from his home at Slimbridge.

Debuts

17 January – Face the Music (1953–1955)
8 February – Our Marie (1953)
10 February – Worzel Gummidge Turns Detective (1953)
11 March – The Pattern of Marriage (1953)
17 March – Robin Hood (1953)
25 April – Strictly Personal (1953)
28 April – Seven Little Australians (1953)
6 May – Reggie Little at Large (1953)
4 July – The Great Detective (1953)
14 July – The Treasure Seekers (1953)
18 July – The Quatermass Experiment (1953)
20 July – The Good Old Days (1953–1983)
25 August – Thames Tug (1953)
23 September – Garrison Theatre (1953–1955)
26 September – A Place of Execution (1953)
6 October – Heidi (1953)
7 November – Johnny, You're Wanted (1953)
11 November 
The Rose and the Ring (1953)
Panorama (1953–present)
6 December – Wuthering Heights (1953)
18 December – Asian Club (1953–1961)
26 December – The Teckman Biography (1953–1954)
Unknown – 
Before Your Very Eyes (1953–1956; ITV 1956–1958)
Rag, Tag and Bobtail (1953–1965)

Continuing television shows

1920s
BBC Wimbledon (1927–1939, 1946–2019, 2021–2024)

1930s
The Boat Race (1938–1939, 1946–2019)
BBC Cricket (1939, 1946–1999, 2020–2024)

1940s
Muffin the Mule (1946–1955, 2005–2006)
Television Newsreel (1948–1954)
Come Dancing (1949–1998)

1950s
Andy Pandy (1950–1970, 2002–2005)
Flower Pot Men (1952–1958, 2001–2002)
Watch with Mother (1952–1975)
The Appleyards (1952–1957)
All Your Own (1952–1961)

Ending this year
 Kaleidoscope (1946–1953)
 Café Continental (1947–1953)
 How Do You View? (1949–1953)
 Robin Hood (1953)
 The Quatermass Experiment (1953)

Births
 11 January – John Sessions, actor (d. 2020)
 24 January – Bruce Jones, actor
 9 February – Ciarán Hinds, Irish actor (Rome)
 17 February – Norman Pace, actor and comedian
 27 February – Gavin Esler, author and television presenter
 24 April – Tim Woodward, actor
 1 May – Rob Spendlove, actor
 16 May – Pierce Brosnan, Irish-born actor (Remington Steele)
 19 May – Victoria Wood, comic performer (d. 2016)
 22 May – Peter Bazalgette, English television executive
 24 May – Alfred Molina, English actor
 26 May – Michael Portillo, English politician, journalist and broadcaster
 19 June – Hilary Jones, physician, television host and media personality
 7 August – Lesley Nicol, actress
 23 September – Nicholas Witchell, journalist
 4 October – Christopher Fairbank, English actor
 12 October – Les Dennis, game show host, actor
 27 October  – Peter Firth, actor
 13 November – Diana Weston, actress
 16 November – Griff Rhys Jones, comedian, actor and writer
 13 December – Jim Davidson, comedian

See also
 1953 in British music
 1953 in the United Kingdom
 List of British films of 1953

References